The 2012 West Asian Basketball League was the 2nd season of the modern era of the West Asian Basketball League.

Preliminary round

Group A

Group B

Knockout round

Quarterfinals
Mahram vs. Aramex

Zob Ahan vs. Al-Mouttahed

Al-Riyadi vs. Duhok

Champville vs. Petrochimi

Semifinals
Mahram vs. Zob Ahan

Al-Riyadi vs. Champville

Final
Mahram vs. Al-Riyadi

External links
FIBA Asia
www.asia-basket.com

2012
2011–12 in Asian basketball leagues
2011–12 in Iranian basketball
2011–12 in Lebanese basketball
2011–12 in Jordanian basketball
2012 in Iraqi sport
Bask